The 2015 NASCAR Camping World Truck Series was the 21st season of the NASCAR Camping World Truck Series, the third highest stock car racing series sanctioned by NASCAR in North America. It was contested over twenty-three races, beginning with the NextEra Energy Resources 250 at Daytona International Speedway and ending with the Ford EcoBoost 200 at Homestead-Miami Speedway. Erik Jones of Kyle Busch Motorsports won the series championship, becoming the youngest champion in the Camping World Truck Series.

Teams and drivers

Complete schedule

Limited schedule

Notes

Driver changes
Tyler Reddick began driving full-time in the No. 19 Ford F-150 for Brad Keselowski Racing. Reddick ran part-time for BKR in 2014 in the same truck.
Erik Jones and Justin Boston attempted their first full-time campaigns for Kyle Busch Motorsports, replacing Bubba Wallace.
Daniel Suárez and Matt Tifft ran part-time schedules for KBM, sharing the ride with team owner Kyle Busch.
Following the divestiture of HScott Motorsports Truck Series operations upon Harry Scott buying out Steve Turner, Ben Kennedy moved over to Red Horse Racing, replacing Germán Quiroga.
Also, JR Motorsports purchased most of the HScott Truck operations. Cole Custer, who had raced selected age-eligible races for Turner Scott, also moved to JR Motorsports.  The team raced primarily races where Custer was eligible (age 17), with five more races run by Sprint Cup drivers at tracks where Custer was ineligible to participate, in preparation for the 2016 season.
Due to a lack of sponsorship, Joey Coulter did not race in 2015. Instead, he assumed the post of team relationships coordinator for GMS Racing.
Spencer Gallagher piloted the No. 23 Chevrolet Silverado for GMS Racing full-time in 2015, after driving part-time in 2014.
Daniel Hemric drove the No. 14 for NTS Motorsports full-time in 2015, after running one race with NTS Motorsports in 2014.

Schedule

The final calendar was released on August 26, 2014, comprising 23 races. Atlanta Motor Speedway, which has not hosted the series since 2012, will return for the second week of the season in late February as a Saturday doubleheader with the Xfinity Series. Fox Sports 1 will televise every race except the Fred's 250 on October 24, which will air on Fox.

Results and standings

Races

Drivers' championship

(key) Bold - Pole position awarded by time. Italics - Pole position set by final practice results or rainout. * – Most laps led.

Owners' championship (Top 15)

Manufacturers' championship

See also

 2015 NASCAR Sprint Cup Series
 2015 NASCAR Xfinity Series
 2015 NASCAR K&N Pro Series East
 2015 NASCAR K&N Pro Series West
 2015 NASCAR Whelen Modified Tour
 2015 NASCAR Whelen Southern Modified Tour
 2015 NASCAR Canadian Tire Series
 2015 NASCAR Mexico Series
 2015 NASCAR Whelen Euro Series

References

NASCAR Truck Series seasons